Post Office Square (est. 1874) in Boston, Massachusetts is a square located in the financial district at the intersection of Milk, Congress, Pearl and Water Streets. It was named in 1874 after the United States Post Office and Sub-Treasury which fronted it, now replaced by the John W. McCormack Post Office and Courthouse.

The square is almost entirely occupied by a privately owned and managed but publicly accessible park, Norman B. Leventhal Park, named for the Boston building manager and designer who designed it. It sits above a parking garage, named "The Garage at Post Office Square." Revenues from parking fund the maintenance of the park. The  park is a popular lunchtime destination for area workers. It features a café, fountains, and a pergola around a central lawn, and the management provides seat cushions for visitors during the summer. Designed by landscape architects The Halvorson Company, the park is also home to "125 species of plants."

History 

In the 18th century, rope manufacturers occupied the area, then it became a residential district, and later a business and commercial area. The Great Boston fire of 1872 swept through the area, and as rebuilding began the area began to be called Post Office Square after the new United States Post Office and Sub-Treasury Building which faced the square.

In 1874, the headquarters of the New England Mutual Life Insurance Company, designed by Nathaniel Bradlee, was erected in the square on the site of what is now Norman B. Leventhal Park. This building was demolished in 1945, and a large parking garage which filled the area of the present park was erected, being completed in 1954.

Post Office Square was the site of a 1964 speech by Lyndon B. Johnson.

There was a transformer explosion and fire in the One Post Office Square building in December 1986. An electric company worker was killed but it was after normal business hours and the building was able to be evacuated with only a few injuries.

The above-ground parking garage was demolished in 1988. The new garage, entirely underground, was opened in 1990 at a cost of $18 million, and the park above it was completed in 1992.

Major buildings
Significant buildings on the square include the following:
John W. McCormack Post Office and Courthouse
New England Telephone and Telegraph Building is a historic structure built in 1947 at 185 Franklin Street. It is a Pending Boston Landmark. A developer purchased the building in 2011 and renamed it "50 Post Office Square." In this building, the laboratory in which the first telephone was built has been reconstructed.
Langham Hotel Boston, a building that until 1977 housed the Federal Reserve Bank of Boston In 1978 it was designated a Boston Landmark.
One Post Office Square
100 Federal Street
Ten Post Office Square (Atlantic National Bank Building) built 1924, a pending Boston Landmark, petition accepted for further study in 2000.

Notes

External links

The Norman B. Leventhal Park
Garage at Post Office Square
SAH Archipedia Building Entry

1874 establishments in Massachusetts
Squares in Boston
Financial District, Boston
Privately owned public spaces